Donald Charles Newmeyer (February 13, 1902 – June 25, 1992) was an American player and coach of gridiron football.

Newmeyer played professional football in the National Football League for the Los Angeles Buccaneers, a traveling team based in Chicago during the 1926 season. He later served as head of the physical education department and head football coach at Los Angeles City College.

He and his wife, Helen, were the parents of actress Julie Newmar.

References

1902 births
1992 deaths
Sportspeople from Cleveland
Players of American football from Cleveland
California Golden Bears football players
Los Angeles Buccaneers players